"Happy Girl" is a song written by Beth Nielsen Chapman and Annie Roboff, and recorded by American country music singer Martina McBride. It was released in April 1998 as the third single from McBride’s album Evolution. It reached a peak of #2 on the U.S. country chart and #4 on the Canadian country chart.

Content
"Happy Girl" is a song in which the female narrator asserts her happiness with life. The song includes penny whistle and accordion.

McBride performed the song at the 32nd annual Country Music Association (CMA) awards. She later sang the song at the Macy's Thanksgiving Day Parade on November 26, 1998.

Chart performance
"Happy Girl" debuted at #70 on the Billboard Hot Country Singles & Tracks (now Hot Country Songs) chart dated for April 25, 1998. It spent 22 weeks on the chart, peaking at #2 on the chart dated for August 8, 1998 and holding that position for two weeks.

Year-end charts

References

1998 singles
1997 songs
Martina McBride songs
Song recordings produced by Paul Worley
Songs written by Beth Nielsen Chapman
RCA Records singles
Songs written by Annie Roboff